Pitch Perfect: Bumper in Berlin (Music from the Peacock Original Series) is the soundtrack to the Peacock comedy television series Pitch Perfect: Bumper in Berlin, a spin-off of the Pitch Perfect film series. The album was released by Universal Music Enterprises on November 23, 2022, the same day as its series premiere, and was led by the single "Know My Name" released prior to the album. It was released in Dolby Atmos on Apple Music.

Promotion and release 
The track "99 Luftballoons x Take On Me" was performed by Adam DeVine, Sarah Hyland and Flula Borg at the annual Macy's Thanksgiving Day Parade in New York City on November 24, 2022 (Thanksgiving). It was live telecasted on NBC and Peacock the same day.

The official Spotify playlist for Pitch Perfect: Bumper in Berlin consisted songs from the original soundtrack, as well as songs from the Pitch Perfect film soundtracks, notably "Cups" and "Flashlight".

Track listing

Reception 
The musical numbers in the series received some praise. Alex Maidy of JoBlo.com wrote "The series is at its best when it is delivering musical performances which Devine gives his all to. There are some solid mash-ups and original songs." Writing for /Film, Barry Levitt said, "The music is what makes 'Pitch Perfect' so memorable, and the songs in 'Bumper in Berlin' are pretty good, even if they pale in comparison. The opening 'Kings & Queens' is probably the most impressive number, but renditions of 'Barbie Girl' and 'Valerie' are pretty fun too. There's also a riff-off, which is the film's crowning glory, and while it's fun, it's so haphazard that it makes you long for the movies. Thankfully everyone here can sing, and the individual performances regularly impress. A big part of the plot comes around an original song, which is completely unremarkable. Everyone in the show is acting like it's Shakespearean in quality, but frankly its quite forgettable, and pales in comparison to 'Flashlight' the original song from 'Pitch Perfect 2'." Shannon O'Connor of The Daily Beast criticised the music, saying "Pitch Perfect is nothing without good music. Even when the movie's story wasn't great then at least there were inspired a capella moments. Sadly, with Bumper in Berlin, the song choices are as uninspired as the story." Elite Dailys Ani Bundel said that the soundtrack to the series captures the "old magic of the first film".

References 

2022 soundtrack albums